The Islamic Azad University, Masjed Soleyman Branch is a branch of Islamic Azad University and is located in Masjed Soleyman, the south western of Iran. It was established in 1986. The university serves almost  1700 students at undergraduate and postgraduate levels. It has 291 full and part-time faculty members carrying out education and research in 45 fields.

See also 
 List of universities in Iran
 Higher Education in Iran
 Masjed Soleyman

References

External links
Official website

m
Buildings and structures in Khuzestan Province
Education in Khuzestan Province